San Diego Pumitas were an American soccer team, founded in 1999. The team competed in the National Premier Soccer League (NPSL), the fourth tier of the American Soccer Pyramid, from 2005 until 2007.

Year-by-year

External links
 San Diego Pumitas FC
 NPSL Official Website

National Premier Soccer League teams
P
Defunct soccer clubs in California
1999 establishments in California
Association football clubs established in 1999
Association football clubs disestablished in 2007
2007 disestablishments in California